Two total lunar eclipses occurred in 1968: 

 13 April 1968 lunar eclipse
 6 October 1968 lunar eclipse

See also 
 List of 20th-century lunar eclipses
 Lists of lunar eclipses